Gotland Military District (MD G) was a military district within the Swedish Armed Forces active between 2000 and 2004. The staff was located within Gotland Garrison in Visby on Gotland.

History
Gotland Military District was formed on 1 July 2000 and was one of four military districts, which were added in connection with the three military regions was decommissioned on 30 June 2000 as a result of the Defence Act of 2000. When the formation of the Gotland Military District occurred, the traditions and heraldic arms of the former Gotland Military Command was taken over.

Gotland Military District was later decommissioned in connection with the Defence Act of 2004. On 17 December 2004 the decommissioning was manifested through a closure and handover ceremony and on 31 December 2004 the district was officially ceased. Its territorial tasks and responsibilities were then transferred from 1 January 2005 to the Central Military District in Strängnäs. Remaining on Gotland was a decommissioning organization until 31 December 2005.

Operations

Gotland Military District consisted of a commanding officer, a staff and a military district group (a total of about 40 employees). The military districts was the regional level in the Swedish Armed Forces' organization and had the following tasks: territorial operations, defense planning, mobilization preparations, intelligence and security service, Home Guard training, voluntary defense activities, physical planning, staff service and operations. This means that the Swedish Armed Forces' contacts with civil authorities and organizations on Gotland largely were handled through the Gotland Military District. Among other things, the military district represented the Swedish Armed Forces in the government pledged assignment on civil-military cooperation, ie the crisis cooperation called "Collaboration on Gotland" (Samverkan på Gotland, GotSam).

Each military district consisted of a number of military districts groups. Within the Gotland Military District was the Home Guard unit called the Gotland Group. I connection of the decommissioning of the Gotland Military District, the territorial responsibility and responsibility of the Gotland Group, was transferred on 1 January 2005 to the Central Military District.

Heraldry and traditions

Coat of arms
The coat of arms of the Gotland Military District Staff was used by the Gotland Military Command Staff from 1994 to 2000. Blazon: "Azure, the provincial badge of Gotland, a ram passant argent, armed or, cross and banner gules, staff, edging and five flaps or. The shield surmounted an erect sword or".

Colours, standards and guidons
The command flag of the commanding officer of Gotland Military District is drawn by Kristina Holmgård-Åkerberg and embroidered by hand in insertion technique by Maj Britt Salander/company Blå Kusten. Blazon: "On blue cloth an erect yellow sword; in the first corner a white ram passant armed yellow and a crosstaff and a banner with edging and five flaps, all yellow".

Medals
In 2005, the Gotlands militärdistriktets (MD G) minnesmedalj ("Gotland Military District (MD G) Commemorative Medal") in silver (MDGMSM) of the 8th size was established. The medal was oval and the medal ribbon is divided in blue, yellow and blue moiré. The district coat of arms is attached to the ribbon.

Commanding officers

Military district commanders
2000–2001: Major general Curt Westberg
2001–2004: Brigadier general Bengt Jerkland
June 2004 – January 2005: Colonel Karl Engelbrektson (acting)

Chiefs of Staff
2000–2004: Överste Anders EK

Names, designations and locations

Footnotes

References

Notes

Print

Web

External links
 (Archived version)

Military districts of Sweden
Disbanded units and formations of Sweden
Military units and formations established in 2000
Military units and formations established in 2004
2000 establishments in Sweden
2004 disestablishments in Sweden
Visby Garrison